Elections to the European Parliament were held in Belgium on 10 June 1979. The Dutch-speaking electoral college elected 13 MEPs and the French-speaking electoral college elected 11 MEPs.

Results

Belgium
European Parliament elections in Belgium
1979 elections in Belgium